The United Kingdom held elections to its devolved governments on 5 May 2016:
2016 National Assembly for Wales election
2016 Northern Ireland Assembly election
2016 Scottish Parliament election